This article lists events from the year 2022 in The Bahamas.

Incumbents 

 Monarch: Elizabeth II (until 8 September), then Charles III
 Governor-General: Cornelius A. Smith
 Prime Minister: Philip Davis

Events 
 1 January – New Year Honours
 7 June - The Bahamas report their first suspected cases of monkeypox.
 1 July – The Bahamas confirms its first case of monkeypox.
 24 July – At least 17 Haitian migrants are killed and 25 others are rescued when their boat capsizes off New Providence, Bahamas.
 8 September – Accession of Charles III as King of the Bahamas following the death of Queen Elizabeth II.
 11 September – Charles III is officially proclaimed King of the Bahamas at the Parliament Square in Nassau.
 19 September – A national holiday is observed on the day of the funeral of Elizabeth II, Queen of the Bahamas. Governor-General Sir Cornelius A. Smith and Prime Minister Philip Davis attend the funeral of Elizabeth II.
 2 October – A state memorial service for Elizabeth II, Queen of the Bahamas, takes place at Christ Church Cathedral in Nassau.
 12 December – Bahamian authorities arrest FTX founder Sam Bankman-Fried and begin the process of extraditing him to the United States.

Deaths 

 6 January – Sidney Poitier, 94, Bahamian-American actor (In the Heat of the Night, Lilies of the Field, Guess Who's Coming to Dinner), Oscar winner (1963).
 10 February - Sir Godfrey Kelly, 93, Olympic sailor (1960, 1964, 1968, 1972)
 28 March - Anita Doherty, 73, athlete, educator and philanthropist
 3 September – Shavez Hart, 29, Olympic sprinter (2016)
 8 September - Elizabeth II, 96, Queen of the Bahamas

See also 
 List of years in the Bahamas
 COVID-19 pandemic in the Bahamas
 2022 Atlantic hurricane season
 2022 in the Caribbean

References

External links 

 U.S. must better engage Bahamas, where our competitor, China, is making major investments (Opinion, The Miami Herald, January 7, 2021)

 
2020s in the Bahamas
Years of the 21st century in the Bahamas
Bahamas
Bahamas